is a politician of Japan who served as the Justice Minister of Japan from 2003 to 2004.

Nozawa graduated from University of Tokyo with the degree of bachelor of civil engineering and joined Japanese National Railways in 1956. During his career at JNR, he obtained the degree of Ph.D. He was first elected as a member of the House of Councillors in 1986. He served as a member of the house until 2004 when he did not run for reelection.

Currently, he is the leader of the Japan-Korea Tunnel Research Institute, an organization trying to create a tunnel link between Japan and South Korea.

References 

Ministers of Justice of Japan
Members of the House of Representatives (Japan)
People from Nagano Prefecture
Living people
University of Tokyo alumni
1933 births